Carlos Urrutia may refer to:

 Carlos Urrutia (Peruvian diplomat), Peru's ambassador to Venezuela
 Carlos Alfredo Urrutia Valenzuela (born 1949), Colombia's ambassador to the United States